RFS may refer to:

Companies and organizations 
 Radio Frequency Systems, a telecommunications company
 New South Wales Rural Fire Service, a volunteer-based firefighting agency in New South Wales, Australia
 Royal Forestry Society, a charitable organisation established in 1882 in Northumberland, England
 Riordan, Freeman & Spogli, a private equity firm today known as Freeman Spogli & Co.
 Rossijskij Futbol'nyj Soyuz or Russian Football Union, the governing body of football in Russia

Computing 
 Receive flow steering, a scaling technique for network traffic processing
 ReiserFS, a general-purpose, journaled computer file system 
 Remote File System, a distributed file system developed by AT&T in the 1980

Other uses 
 Renewable Fuel Standard (United States), a US federal program
 The Review of Financial Studies, an academic journal
 Russian Federation Ship, an occasionally applied exonymical ship prefix for the Russian Navy that is not used by it officially
 Registered Financial Specialist, a Graduate Post Nominal designation at the American Academy of Financial Management
 Regardless of Feature Size, a term used in geometric dimensioning and tolerancing
 FK Rīgas Futbola skola, Latvian association football club